Haiti competed at the 1960 Summer Olympics in Rome, Italy.  It was the first time in 28 years that the nation had sent athletes to the Olympic Games. Haiti's delegation consisted of two people, weightlifter Philome Laguerre and the head of the delegation, Pierre Plaisimond.

Weightlifting

Men

References
Official Olympic Reports

Nations at the 1960 Summer Olympics
1960
Summer Olympics